Kuagica Sebastião Bondo David (born 10 August 1990 in Luanda, Angola) is an Angolan professional footballer who plays as a defender.

Career
Kuagica played youth football in Portugal for ADCE Diogo Cão and União da Madeira before returning to his country of birth and playing for Recreativo do Libolo and ASA. He played for Minangkabau in Indonesia in the 2010-11 season, followed by a brief return to Angola where he played for Nacional de Benguela. In November 2011, Kuagica signed for English club Rochdale on a deal until the end of the season. He was released in March 2012 having not made any first team appearances. Kuagica then once again returned to Angola where he had two further spells with Recreativo do Libolo, playing for 1º de Agosto in between. Kuagica then played in Lithuania and Cyprus for Stumbras and Ermis Aradippou respectively, then returned to England in 2019 to play for Southern Football League club Barnstaple Town. Later that season he joined National League South club Dulwich Hamlet. In August 2020 he agreed to stay with Dulwich for the 2020-21 season.

References

External links 
 at National-Football-Teams 
 at Soccerway

1990 births
Living people
Association football defenders
Angolan footballers
Angola international footballers
C.F. União players
C.R.D. Libolo players
Atlético Sport Aviação players
Rochdale A.F.C. players
C.D. Primeiro de Agosto players
FC Stumbras players
Ermis Aradippou FC players
Barnstaple Town F.C. players
Dulwich Hamlet F.C. players
Girabola players
A Lyga players
Cypriot First Division players
Southern Football League players
National League (English football) players
Angolan expatriate footballers
Expatriate footballers in Indonesia
Expatriate footballers in England
Expatriate footballers in Lithuania
Expatriate footballers in Cyprus